Miloš Tomić (born 2 April 1980 in Belgrade, SR Serbia, Yugoslavia) is a Serbian rower.

He participated at the 2004 Summer Olympics and finished first in the B final of the men's lightweight four. He is a 2006 graduate of the Columbia University School of Engineering.

Notes

References

1980 births
Living people
Serbian male rowers
Olympic rowers of Serbia and Montenegro
Rowers at the 2004 Summer Olympics
Columbia Lions rowers
World Rowing Championships medalists for Serbia
European Rowing Championships medalists